Trazos is the second album by Lila Downs. It was released in 1998. The songs are in a jazzy, traditional style.

Track listing 
 "Bésame mucho" (Consuelo Velázquez)
"Quinto patio" (Manuel R. Piña)
"Perfume de gardenias" (Rafael Hernández Marín)
"La malagueña salerosa" (Elpidio Ramírez/ P. Galindo)
"Almendra" (Anon.)
 "Un poco más" (Álvaro Carrillo)
"Arenita azul" (Trad.)
"Estrellita " (Anom.) 
"Arráncame la vida" (María Teresa Lara)
"Mambo no. 8" (Dámaso Pérez Prado) 
"La niña" (Lila Downs)
 "Sale sobrando" (Lila Downs/Paul Cohen)
 "Hanal weech (Cumbia maya)" (Rafael Hernández Marín)

External links 
 Lila Downs 
 

1998 albums